Jean Marigny (born 9 April 1939 in Cherbourg) is a French emeritus professor of Stendhal University in Grenoble, where he taught English and American literature. He is a specialist in vampire studies, from ancient folklore to modern vampire myth.

Career 
'Group of Studies and Research on Fantasy') which he directed several years at Stendhal University. He is also a member of the Canadian branch of the Transylvanian Society of Dracula.

After his doctoral dissertation in 1985, he has published a number of essays and translated novels and short stories about the vampire theme. Marigny is considered one of the greatest vampire specialists around the world, particularly with regard to Anglo-Saxon fiction on the subject.

What fascinates Marigny about vampire is the character: a paradoxical being. As he explains, 'No fictional character is more emblematic of the fantasy than the vampire. If it is true that [...] fantasy is based on paradox, the vampire is the best illustration, since it is both dead and alive.'

Publications 
 Le Vampire dans la littérature anglo-saxonne (1983), doctoral dissertation on Anglo-Saxon literature (published by Didier-Érudition in 1985)
 Histoires anglo-saxonnes de Vampires (Librairie des Champs-Élysées, 1978)
 Sang pour sang : Le réveil des vampires, coll. « Découvertes Gallimard » (nº 161), série Culture et société. Paris : Éditions Gallimard, 1992 (new edition in 2010;)
 UK edition – Vampires: The World of the Undead, 'New Horizons' series. Thames & Hudson, 1994
 US edition – Vampires: Restless Creatures of the Night, "Abrams Discoveries" series. Harry N. Abrams, 1994
 Dracula (centennial of Bram Stoker's Dracula), 1997
 Les Mondes perdus de Clark Ashton Smith, La Clef d'Argent, 2007, 
 Dracula, prince des ténèbres, in collaboration with Céline du Chéné, 2009
 La fascination des vampires, illustration de Albert-Joseph Penot, coll. « 50 Questions » (nº 49). , 2009
 Les femmes vampires, José Corti, 2010 (anthology co-directed with )
 Vampires : de la légende au mythe moderne, La Martinière, 2011

References

External links 
  

1939 births
Vampirism
French academics
English literature academics
20th-century French non-fiction writers
Living people
Academic staff of Stendhal University